Ilrey Oliver (2 September 1962 – 26 December 2002) was a Jamaican sprinter. She competed in the women's 400 metres at the 1984 Summer Olympics. She was killed in a road accident in Florida in 2002.

References

External links
 

1962 births
2002 deaths
Athletes (track and field) at the 1984 Summer Olympics
Jamaican female sprinters
Olympic athletes of Jamaica
Athletes (track and field) at the 1987 Pan American Games
Pan American Games bronze medalists for Jamaica
Pan American Games medalists in athletics (track and field)
Place of birth missing
Road incident deaths in Florida
Medalists at the 1987 Pan American Games
Olympic female sprinters
20th-century Jamaican women